Joan Bridge (13 March 1912 – 8 December 2009) was a British costume designer from Ripley in Derbyshire. She won at the 39th Academy Awards in the category of Best Costume design-Color for her work on A Man for All Seasons, which she shared with Elizabeth Haffenden. In addition she won the BAFTA as well. She worked on over 100 films during her long career. 

On retirement she moved to Totteridge and became a member of South Herts Golf Club where she played into her 90s.

Her funeral was held at Golders Green on 14 December 2009.

References

External links

1912 births
2009 deaths
Best Costume Design Academy Award winners
Best Costume Design BAFTA Award winners
British costume designers
Women costume designers
People from Ripley, Derbyshire
People from Totteridge